Anna Catarina Lidén (born 5 April 1947) is a Swedish actress. She has appeared in more than 50 films and television shows since 1971. She was the mother of the musician and DJ, Tim Bergling, who was better known as Avicii.

Selected filmography
 Buddies (1976)
 Father to Be (1979)
 To Be a Millionaire (1980)
 My Life as a Dog (1985) 
 Allra käraste syster (1988)
 Beck – Sista vittnet (2002)

References

External links

1947 births
Living people
20th-century Swedish actresses
21st-century Swedish actresses
Swedish film actresses
Swedish television actresses
People from Karlsborg Municipality
Best Supporting Actress Guldbagge Award winners